Quintus Marcius Rufus was a Roman commander of Marcus Licinius Crassus during the Third Servile War.

History
Rufus was born into a wealthy family of the Roman Republic around 100 BC. He was of the Marcia Gens. Rufus as a member of the wealthy Roman class and a future commander was a trained and skilled fighter. He was also a promising tactician and Roman commander.

Third Servile War
Rufus was appointed one of Crassus' commanders following his order by the senate to defeat Spartacus and his army of slaves. When Gannicus and Castus, two of Spartacus' former commanders, split from the main force with around 12,000 rebels (2 Legions), Rufus and another commander: Lucius Pomptinus, were dispatched to defeat them. Two legions were placed under his and Pomptinus' command, and they succeeded in defeating both Gannicus and Castus somewhere in Cantenna, during the decisive battle in 71 BC.

Portrayals
Rufus was portrayed by Roy Snow in Spartacus: War of the Damned.

1st-century BC Romans
Third Servile War